"Uber Everywhere" is the debut single by American hip hop recording artist MadeinTYO. The song was released on February 26, 2016 by Privateclub Records. "Uber Everywhere" is about the extensive use of Uber. It was produced by K Swisha. "Uber Everywhere" peaked at number 51 on the Billboard Hot 100. The single was certified double platinum by the Recording Industry Association of America (RIAA).

Music video
The song's accompanying music video premiered on August 21, 2015 on Privateclub Records YouTube channel. Since its release, the music video has received over 59 million views on YouTube. Credit for directing was given to Maria Skobeleva.

Remixes
On July 12, 2016 an official remix was released accompanying a music video featuring artist Travis Scott, this remix was the version included on MadeinTYO's mixtape You Are Forgiven. Tory Lanez released his own modified remix of the song. Trey Songz released a remix entitled "Lyft Everywhere". Also remixed by Houston rapper Trill Sammy. British artist Black The Ripper released a pro-cannabis version of the song entitled "Light Up Everywhere".

Commercial performance
"Uber Everywhere" debuted at number 99 on Billboard Hot 100 for the chart dated April 16, 2016. The song peaked at number 51 on the Billboard Hot 100.

Charts

Weekly charts

Year-end charts

Certifications

References

External links

2015 songs
2016 debut singles
Southern hip hop songs